Nut job or nutjob may refer to:

Film and television
 The Nut Job, a 2014 Canadian-South Korean animated film
 "Nut Job", a 2013 episode of Deal with It
 "Nut Job", a 2012 episode of American Restoration
 "Nut Job", a 2003 episode of The Bernie Mac Show

See also
 "Nut Job of the Week", a segment on the Australian TV show The Chaser's War on Everything
 Nut case (disambiguation)
 Nutter (disambiguation)
 Nut (disambiguation)
 Job (disambiguation)